"Cryin'" is a song by American hard rock band Aerosmith. It was written by Steven Tyler, Joe Perry, and Taylor Rhodes, and was released by Geffen Records on June 20, 1993, as a single from their 11th studio album, Get a Grip (1993). The single reached number 12 on the US Billboard Hot 100, ending the year at number 60 overall. The song is one of their most successful hits in Europe, reaching number one in Norway, number three in Iceland, Portugal, and Sweden, and number 17 on the UK Singles Chart. The song went Gold in the United States for selling over 500,000 copies.

The song's music video features Alicia Silverstone, Stephen Dorff and Josh Holloway.

Background
Tyler described the song saying "It was country – we just Aerosmith’d it.”

Critical reception
Alan Jones from Music Week gave the song three out of five, describing it as "a high-octane performance" and named it the best song from the Get A Grip album. He also declared it as "anthemic and compelling. Expect a brief but glittering chart life." Another editor, Andy Martin, also gave it three out of five, adding that "it is hard to see the single having any more than a brief but glittering run."

Music video

The accompanying music video for the song, directed by Marty Callner, features the first of three successive appearances by Alicia Silverstone in the band's videos, the next two being "Amazing" (1993) and "Crazy" (1994). Silverstone was 16 years old when "Cryin'" was filmed. In the video, the band performs in the Central Congregational Church in Fall River, Massachusetts. The video flashes back and forth between the band and Silverstone, who plays a teen who has a falling out with her boyfriend (played by Stephen Dorff) after catching him cheating. She feigns an attempt to kiss him, but instead leans away, annoying him. She then punches him and shoves him out of the car, leaving him in the dust. She begins a phase of rebellion and individuality and gets a navel piercing, which has largely been credited as introducing navel piercing to mainstream culture. After having her purse stolen by another young man (played by then-unknown Josh Holloway of Lost), she chases him down and knocks him to the ground. The video then cuts to her standing on the edge of an overpass, contemplating jumping.  Her ex-boyfriend arrives on the scene, along with numerous police officers, encouraging her to come down from the bridge.  She jumps, but a bungee rope is revealed, arresting her fall and leaving her dangling over the freeway, laughing at Dorff's character.  The video ends with the dangling Silverstone looking up and giving Dorff the finger.

The video was a smash success on MTV, becoming the most requested video in 1993 and earning the band several awards at the Video Music Awards.

Awards
 MTV Video Music Award for Video of the Year, 1994
 MTV Video Music Award for Viewer's Choice, 1994
 MTV Video Music Award for Best Group Video, 1994

Track listings

 US and Canadian 7-inch and cassette single
A. "Cryin'" (LP version) – 5:08
B. "Walk On Down" (LP version) – 3:39

 UK CD single
 "Cryin'" (LP version) – 5:08
 "Walk On Down" (LP version) – 3:39
 "I'm Down" (LP version) – 2:20
 "My Fist Your Face" (LP version) – 4:21

 European CD single
 "Cryin'" (LP version) – 5:08
 "Love in an Elevator" (LP version) – 5:22
 "Janie's Got a Gun" (LP version) – 5:29

 German 7-inch single
A. "Cryin'" – 5:08
B. "Love in an Elevator" – 5:22

 French CD and cassette single
 "Cryin'" (LP version) – 5:08
 "Janie's Got a Gun" (LP version) – 5:29

 Australian CD single
 "Cryin'"
 "Janie's Got a Gun"
 "Love in an Elevator"

Charts

Weekly charts

Year-end charts

Certifications

Release history

References

1992 songs
1993 singles
Aerosmith songs
Geffen Records singles
MTV Video of the Year Award
Music videos directed by Marty Callner
Number-one singles in Norway
Song recordings produced by Bruce Fairbairn
Songs written by Joe Perry (musician)
Songs written by Steven Tyler
Songs written by Taylor Rhodes